Salehpur Dona is a village in Sultanpur Lodhi tehsil in Kapurthala district of Punjab, India. The village is administrated by a Sarpanch who is an elected representative of village as per the constitution of India and Panchayati raj (India).

The village has a population of 286, 142 of whom are male, and 144 female. The village has about 49 households.

List of cities near the village 
Bhulath
Kapurthala 
Phagwara 
Sultanpur Lodhi, the nearest

Air travel connectivity 
The closest International airport to the village is Sri Guru Ram Dass Jee International Airport.

Other public transit
Public bus service is available within 5-10 kilometers of the village, as is a train station. Private bus service exists in the village.

References 

https://www.realestatexp.in/punjab/properties-for-sale-in-sultanpur%20lodhi.html
https://villageinfo.in/punjab/kapurthala/sultanpur-lodhi/salehpur-dona.html

External links
 Villages in Kapurthala

Villages in Kapurthala district